Ulf Gottfrid Stark (12 July 1944 – 13 June 2017) was a Swedish author and screenwriter (he adapted several of his own books for film and wrote the screenplay for the 1999 film Tsatsiki, morsan och polisen).

Stark has collaborated with the illustrators Anna Höglund and Mati Lepp.

From 1989 to 1998 he was an elected member of the Swedish Academy for Children's Books.

In 1998 he received the Nordic Children's Book Prize.

Stark died 13 June 2017 in Stockholm, Sweden.

Career
Stark was born and grew up in Stureby, Stockholm Municipality, which place features in several of his books. Stark's interest in writing started early; during his time at secondary school he was introduced to writing by his classmate , and in 1964 he wrote his first poetry collection, . Following this, Stark's interest in writing for a career was greatly encouraged.

Stark died on 13 June 2017 at the age of 72 after suffering from cancer.

Selected bibliography

English translations
2005 – Can You Whistle, Johanna?, (Gecko Press) 
2021 – Can You Whistle, Johanna?, (Gecko Press) 
2005 – My Friend Percy's Magical Gym Shoes, (Gecko Press) 
2007 – My Friend Percy and the Sheik, (Gecko Press) 
2007 – My Friend Percy and Buffalo Bill, (Gecko Press) 
2010 – Fruitloops and Dipsticks, (Gecko Press)  
2015 – When Dad Showed Me the Universe, (Gecko Press) 
2019 – The Runaways, (Gecko Press)

References

External links
 Ulf Stark on www.forfatterweb.dk (Danish)
 
 Ulf Stark (written on Danish)
 Ulf Stark on Bonnier Carlsen's website
 Ulf Stark on Gecko Press's website

1944 births
2017 deaths
Swedish-language writers
Swedish children's writers
Swedish screenwriters
Swedish male screenwriters
Writers from Stockholm
August Prize winners
Best Screenplay Guldbagge Award winners
Swedish male novelists
Deaths from cancer in Sweden
Swedish people of Walloon descent